Perforatella bidentata is a species of air-breathing land snail, a terrestrial pulmonate gastropod mollusk in the family Hygromiidae, the hairy snails and their allies.

Life cycle 
The size of the egg is 1.7 × 2 mm.

This species of snail makes and uses love darts during mating.

Distribution 
This species is known to occur in:
 Ukraine
 France

References

 Sysoev, A. V. & Schileyko, A. A. (2009). Land snails and slugs of Russia and adjacent countries. Sofia/Moskva (Pensoft). 312 pp., 142 plates.

External links
 Gmelin J.F. (1791). Vermes. In: Gmelin J.F. (Ed.) Caroli a Linnaei Systema Naturae per Regna Tria Naturae, Ed. 13. Tome 1(6). G.E. Beer, Lipsiae 
 De Jong, Y.; Verbeek, M.; Michelsen, V.; Bjørn, P. D. P.; Los, W.; Steeman, F.; Bailly, N.; Basire, C.; Chylarecki, P.; Stloukal, E.; Hagedorn, G.; Wetzel, F.; Glöckler, F.; Kroupa, A.; Korb, G.; Hoffmann, A.; Häuser, C.; Kohlbecker, A.; Müller, A.; Güntsch, A.; Stoev, P.; Penev, L. (2014). Fauna Europaea – all European animal species on the web. Biodiversity Data Journal. 2: e4034

Hygromiidae
Gastropods described in 1791
Taxa named by Johann Friedrich Gmelin